Galium wrightii, common name Wright's bedstraw, is a species of plants in the Rubiaceae. It is native to northwestern Mexico and southwestern United States: Sonora, Chihuahua, Arizona, New Mexico, western Texas, southwestern Utah (Washington Co.), southern Nevada (Clark + Lincoln Cos.) and southeastern California (San Bernardino County) In California, this plant is ranked as rare, threatened, or endangered in CA; common elsewhere.

References

External links
Photo of herbarium specimen at Missouri Botanical Garden, collected in Arizona, Galium wrightii 
Calflora taxon report, University of California at Berkeley
Vascular Plants of the Gila Wilderness, Western New Mexico University,  Department of Natural Sciences, Galium wrightii
Gardening Europe

wrightii
Flora of California
Flora of Nevada
Flora of Sonora
Flora of Chihuahua (state)
Flora of Arizona
Flora of New Mexico
Flora of Texas
Plants described in 1852
Flora without expected TNC conservation status